James O'Malley may refer to:
 J. Pat O'Malley (1904–1985), English singer and character actor
 James O'Malley, perpetrator in the murder of Buddy Musso